Charlotte York (formerly Charlotte York MacDougal, later Charlotte York Goldenblatt) is a fictional character on the HBO-produced television series Sex and the City. She is portrayed by actress Kristin Davis, who received two Screen Actors Guild Awards for her performance.

Character information
The character of Charlotte first appeared in Candace Bushnell's newspaper column "Sex and the City" as a recurring character and friend of Carrie, where she is introduced as an English journalist.

The television version of Charlotte York is the daughter of Dr. Stephen Foster York and Sandra Whitehead "Muffin" York. She is an art dealer with a Connecticut blue-blooded upbringing. Charlotte graduated from Smith College with a Bachelor of Arts in Art History and a minor in Finance; she lived in Haven-Wesley House and was a member of the College Republicans and Kappa Kappa Gamma (although in real life Smith has no sororities). She is the most conservative and traditional of the group, placing more emphasis on emotional love than lust, believing in many romantic ideals, and always searching for her "knight in shining armor." Presenting a more straightforward attitude about relationships, usually based upon "The Rules" of love and dating, she often scoffs at the lewder, more libertine antics that the show presents (primarily from Samantha).

Despite her conservative outlook, she has been known to make confessions that surprise even her sexually freer girlfriends (such as her level of dirty talk and oral sex). She gives up her career shortly after marrying her first husband, Trey MacDougal, but divorces him due to irreconcilable differences regarding having children, his dependent relationship with his mother and their incompatible sex life. She receives a Park Avenue apartment as part of the divorce settlement, although this is a battle fiercely fought by Trey's mother, Bunny. Charlotte subsequently marries her divorce lawyer, Harry Goldenblatt, a man who seems the antithesis of all of the qualities she had decided her perfect man would have (he is short, bald and has a very hairy back), but who actually ends up being a funny, devoted partner. She converts to Judaism in order to marry him, and models herself vaguely on Elizabeth Taylor in this aspect; Charlotte also decides to name her dog Elizabeth Taylor. In the series finale, Charlotte and Harry adopt a baby girl, Lily, from China. In the movie, Sex and the City, she and Harry have a biological baby girl, whom they name Rose.

In And Just Like That..., picking up over a decade later, Charlotte and Harry dote on their teen daughters—musically accomplished Lily and independent-minded Rose. She is distraught when Carrie's husband John dies of a heart attack, and Charlotte feels responsible, having pushed Carrie to attend Lily's recital when she otherwise would have been with him; Carrie assures Charlotte she is blameless. Stanford confronts Charlotte, saying she has never accepted him as part of the girls' inner circle. Anthony advises Charlotte after twelve-year-old Rose admits she does not feel like a girl. Charlotte goes into overdrive to make her and Harry's social circle more diverse. To that goal, she cultivates a friendship with Lisa and Herbert Wexley, a socially prominent African-American couple whose son attends Lily's school. Charlotte coordinates Carrie's post-operative care following hip surgery.

In a Zoom meeting with her mom-friends, Charlotte is shocked to learn that daughter Rose now identifies as non-binary and goes by the name, "Rock". After discussing Rock's gender identity with school personnel, Harry and Charlotte are left confused. Charlotte is dismayed when both Lily and Rock want to update their shared bedroom to reflect each one's individual tastes and ages. Charlotte panics after Lily walks in on her and Harry having oral sex. Charlotte then awkwardly claims she was just checking Harry for cancer, which upsets Lily. Charlotte has a frank talk with Lily after discovering her semi-sexy selfies posted on Instagram. After several rabbis cancel, Charlotte finds a trans rabbi to officiate Rock's "They Mitzvah". At the ceremony, Rock refuses to participate, claiming to not identify with any particular group, religion, gender, non-gender, or anything else. Charlotte, a Jewish convert who never had a Bat Mitzvah, takes Rock's place.

Background and personality
Charlotte is viewed by some to be the most naïve of the four characters, often showing signs of belief in the old-fashioned, "love conquers all" notion. This has earned her the nickname "Park Avenue Pollyanna," coined by Carrie Bradshaw in narrations. Yet, her friends are sometimes envious and even in awe of her overall optimism on love and life, leading Carrie to dedicate her book to Charlotte. Charlotte is fiercely optimistic, although often anxious to make sure everything goes right. She also possesses a supportive personality with regard to her friends, always "being there" for them. Due to her conservative outlook in relationships, however, she sometimes clashes with the sexually liberal Samantha, once asking, after Samantha has sex with Charlotte's brother, "Is your vagina in the New York City guide books? Because it should be; it's the hottest spot in town, it's always open!" Yet in this instance, she apologizes by baking Samantha a basket of muffins, demonstrating her classic graceful and sweet-natured style.

Her belief in romance leads her to decide to not have sex with fiancé Trey until the honeymoon. However, she is confronted by the problems of this when she discovers, the night before the wedding, when she tries to seduce Trey, that he is impotent. Later, she realizes he has problems sleeping with her and they do a lot of work to solve the issue. She is also very loyal to her friends (being uncharacteristically aggressive in cursing at Mr. Big after he abandons Carrie at the altar in the first film) and to her belief in the sanctity of marriage (she is the only friend to chastise and shame Carrie regarding her adulterous affair with Mr. Big). She also faces a comeuppance in her relationship with Harry Goldenblatt. She is not attracted to him but has sex with him and calls it "the best sex of my life". She tries to change him into her ideal man but stops when she sees how much that hurts Harry. Finally, she becomes hysterical after she converts to Judaism and prepares a perfect dinner for Harry, when he won't propose to her, and she insults him by telling him how unsuitable he is for her, which causes him to break up with her. Only when she finally agrees to accept Harry on his own terms, he does propose to her, and they, independent of any of Charlotte's machinations, end up having a relationship that fulfills all of the ideals of romanticism.

It is revealed throughout the series that Charlotte enjoyed much social acclaim in her younger life, such as being prom queen, varsity cheerleader, track and field captain, teen model, and equestrienne. She is occasionally described as a WASP, an identity she seems to have happily accepted before her conversion to Judaism.

Marriages

Trey MacDougal
Trey MacDougal (Kyle MacLachlan) is a tall, handsome doctor from an upper-class family with an overbearing, frequently present mother who views Charlotte as a rival for her son's affections. Trey and Charlotte meet after Charlotte has resolved to meet her husband in the coming year. Their initial introduction is one in which he proves her knight in shining armor: having had a horrible date, Charlotte is nearly hit by his taxi. Trey gets out of the taxi to help her, and it is implied that they fell in "love at first sight." Charlotte feels that Trey is an ideal boyfriend/husband-candidate. After only a mere month of dating, Charlotte becomes anxious to receive his proposal. When introduced to the royal MacDougal matriarch, Bunny, Charlotte sees how easily Trey can be manipulated and cannot help noticing his mother's methods. Frustrated with waiting, Charlotte uses Bunny's technique and suggests (at a restaurant) that they should marry, to which Trey casually and characteristically responds, "All righty". Charlotte is furious at this response, because it was hardly the proposal of her dreams—the next day she tells Carrie she proposed to herself. Later, Trey makes up for it by stopping in front of Tiffany & Co. during a walk and suggesting that they look for "the most beautiful engagement ring they have."

They decide not to have sex until they are married, but on the day before their wedding, Charlotte gets drunk and visits Trey's apartment to seduce him. Trey is unable to perform, possibly meaning he is infertile. Charlotte addresses her concern to Carrie before she walks down the aisle, but Carrie attempts to comfort her and the marriage takes place. After they are married, Trey continues to be unable to perform in the bedroom. It is implied that his problem is not impotency, as Charlotte catches him masturbating in the bathroom to pornographic magazines. Because of their sexual problems, the two separate. They later get back together when Trey agrees to address the problem, and though he initially has problems, they eventually are able to have regular sex. After some time, Charlotte finds she has not been able to get pregnant, and discovers that she has some fertility problems. The couple starts trying IVF, but Trey, after initially agreeing to it, ultimately decides that he does not feel ready for children. The two divorce because of their different goals in the marriage.

Harry Goldenblatt
Harry Goldenblatt (Evan Handler) is Charlotte's divorce lawyer. Although Charlotte is initially put off by Harry's constant sweating, messy eating, shortness, baldness, and hairy body, she ends up sleeping with him when Harry confesses his intense attraction to her. She finds it is the best sex she has ever had. She tries to keep their relationship strictly sexual but soon becomes emotionally attached due to Harry's kindness, cleverness, and obvious love for her. Initially she tries to change him so that he will more closely fit her image of the ideal man, but these attempts cause Harry distress and Charlotte realizes their futility, and gradually accepts Harry for who he is. Charlotte converts to Judaism in response to Harry's avowal that he can only marry a Jewish woman, but she soon ends up ruining the relationship in a fit of anger by demanding he set a wedding date and telling him that everyone wonders why a catch like her is bothering with a schlub like him. Hurt at hearing what he believes to be what Charlotte really thinks about him, Harry breaks up with her. But after several weeks of bad blind dates, Charlotte bumps into Harry at the local synagogue singles' night and admits her wrongs, professing her deep love for him and agreeing finally to accept him as he is, rather than molding him to suit her. She says that she does not care if he ever marries her, as long as she can be with him. Harry is touched and proposes to Charlotte on the spot.

Sex and the City film 

The movie begins with Charlotte's life with her daughter Lily and husband Harry and they are perfectly happy living in New York. When Carrie's wedding to Big ends in a mess, Charlotte goes with Carrie (along with Samantha and Miranda) to where she was to have her honeymoon with Big. Charlotte is extremely careful in Mexico and refuses to eat any of the food there, instead bringing her own. The full liquid diet turns out to be a bad idea, as she becomes sick and gets diarrhea. Even though she and Harry had given up hoping for another baby, Charlotte unexpectedly discovers she is pregnant, much to her joy. At this moment, it seems that everything Charlotte has ever wanted is finally coming true, and Charlotte becomes "so happy, she's terrified." In the movie it is also revealed that Charlotte always believed Carrie and Big would end up together, and when she sees Big in the street she tells him, "I curse the day you were born." It is then that Charlotte goes into labour, and Big takes her to the hospital and waits until the baby is born. Charlotte and Harry are overjoyed when she gives birth to a baby girl they name Rose. The final scenes of the movie show Harry and Charlotte with their two daughters.

Sex and the City 2 

Charlotte is a wealthy museum docent with two children and live-in, full-time help. However, she becomes stressed with motherhood and feels incapable of being a good mother to her children, eventually becoming worried that Harry is sleeping with their nanny. Charlotte later escapes to Abu Dhabi with her friends where she is still unable to ease the stresses of motherhood.

Charlotte's conflicts are resolved when it is revealed that her children's nanny, Erin, is a lesbian, and her stress about motherhood is put to rest after confiding and receiving reassurances from Miranda while the two had a conversation in the private bar of their hotel room. From then on, she uses Carrie's old apartment as an occasional "break" from her family life.

References

External links
 Archive of the original Sex and the City newspaper columns

Fictional American Jews
Fictional Jewish women
Fictional characters from Connecticut
Fictional characters from New York City
Television characters introduced in 1998
Fictional socialites
Sex and the City characters
Female characters in television